Tom Dollar is a 1967 comedic spy film written and directed by Marcello Ciorciolini and starring Maurice Poli in the title role.  It is based on a fotoromanzo, starring the same Poli, published in over 30 countries. It was shot in Tehran.

Plot
Special agent Tom Dollar investigates the mysterious death of the Iranian prince Barancan.

Cast 
  Maurice Poli as Tom Dollar
  Giorgia Moll as Samia 
 Erika Blanc as Lady Barbara Crane
 Franco Ressel as Mr. Gaber
 Jacques Herlin as Mr. Osborne
 Sojiro Kikukawa as Chief of Sings
 Jean Rougeul as Crisantemo
 Mirko Ellis

Production
Tom Dollar was based on the photonovel of the same name by Al Petre. It was one of the first photonovels based on a secret agent and was released in the magazine Bolero Film in 1965. Maurice Poli played the role of Tom Dollar, and had already appeared in the photonovels as the character.

The film was predominantly shot in Rome, including scenes at the Villa Miani.

Release
Tom Dollar was released in Italy in 1967 where it was distributed by Euro International.

See also
 List of Italian films of 1967
 List of French films of 1967

References

Footnotes

Sources

External links

1967 films
1960s spy thriller films
Italian spy thriller films
French spy thriller films
Films directed by Marcello Ciorciolini
Films set in Tehran
Films shot in Tehran
Italian science fiction films
Films shot in Rome
1960s science fiction films
1960s Italian films
1960s French films